"I Won't Hold You Back" is a song by American rock band Toto, written and sung by Steve Lukather for their fourth album, Toto IV, released in 1982 (see 1982 in music). The song features the Eagles' bass player Timothy B. Schmit on backing vocals during the choruses.

Reception
Cash Box described it as "a soft torch tune about a man letting go of his lover, praising the "somber vocals, light piano and electric guitar flourishes." Billboard described it as a "grandly-orchestrated ballad".

Chart performance
The power ballad peaked at number 10 in the U.S. on the Billboard Hot 100 chart on May 7, 1983; becoming their fourth and last top ten hit. It also spent three weeks at number one on the U.S. Adult Contemporary chart. The single only managed to scrape into the top 40 on the UK Singles Chart at No. 37. In Canada, it peaked at number 17 on the RPM Top Singles chart, as well as reaching No. 1 on the Adult Contemporary chart. It also peaked at number 11 in Ireland.

Personnel
Toto
 Steve Lukather – lead and backing vocals, guitars
 David Paich – piano, orchestral arrangements
 Steve Porcaro – synthesizer
 David Hungate – bass
 Jeff Porcaro – drums, percussion

Additional musicians
Timothy B. Schmit – backing vocals
James Newton Howard – orchestral arrangements
Marty Paich – orchestral arrangements
Michael McDonald - backing vocals

Charts

Weekly charts

Year-end charts

Sampling
The song was later sampled by house DJ Roger Sanchez in 2001 for his song "Another Chance", reaching number one in the UK Singles Chart.

Release history

See also
List of Billboard Adult Contemporary number ones of 1983

References

1982 songs
1982 singles
Toto (band) songs
Rock ballads
Songs written by Steve Lukather
Columbia Records singles
1980s ballads